Sweden held a general election on 17 September 2010.

National results
There were 5,960,408 valid ballots cast for a turnout of 84.63%.

Elected MP's

Regional results

Percentage share

By votes

Results by statistical area

Percentage share

By votes

Constituency results

Percentage share

By votes

Municipal summary

Municipal results

Blekinge

Dalarna

Gotland

Gävleborg

Halland

Jämtland

Jönköping

Kalmar

Kronoberg

Norrbotten

Skåne

Malmö

Skåne NE

Skåne S

Skåne W

Stockholm

Stockholm (city)

Stockholm County

Södermanland

Uppsala

Värmland

Västerbotten

Västernorrland

Västmanland

Västra Götaland

Gothenburg

Västra Götaland E

Västra Götaland N

Västra Götaland S

Västra Götaland W

Örebro

Östergötland

References

General elections in Sweden